Francis Gillespie (26 March 1889 – 18 June 1916) was an English cricketer. He played six first-class matches for Surrey in 1913. He was killed in action during World War I.

See also
 List of Surrey County Cricket Club players
 List of cricketers who were killed during military service

References

External links
 

1889 births
1916 deaths
English cricketers
Surrey cricketers
People from Upper Norwood
Sportspeople from Surrey
British military personnel killed in World War I